Thomas E. Mees (October 13, 1949  – August 14, 1996) was an American sportscaster best known for his role in hosting professional and collegiate ice hockey and for being a prominent personality on ESPN during that network's early years.

Early life and career
Mees began his career as a student at the University of Delaware in Newark. After graduation in 1972, he became the sports director at WILM-AM radio in Wilmington. Mees returned to Delaware in 1992 when he announced the Blue Hens' America East Championship for ESPN from the field house.

After six years in Wilmington and one year at WECA-TV in Tallahassee, Florida, Mees was hired by ESPN as one of their first on-air personalities for the network's launch in 1979 on September 7. In 2005, he was inducted into the Delaware Sports Museum and Hall of Fame.

ESPN
Mees was a lead anchor on SportsCenter from 1979 to 1985 when he took on hosting duties for NHL on ESPN with John Saunders as a secondary host. ESPN later lost the NHL contract to SportsChannel America, and he returned full-time to SportsCenter. When the NHL returned to ESPN in 1992–93, he worked play-by-play NHL games during the season with Darren Pang or John Davidson as his analyst, and hosted SportsCenter in the off-season. Mees was an early advocate of NCAA Ice Hockey on ESPN, worked play-by-play for the Frozen Four (NCAA Hockey's championship tournament), and contributed to the increased visibility of that tournament .

Other sports Mees called for ESPN included college basketball, college football, and Major League Baseball. He also anchored the network's coverage of the United States Football League in the 1980s.

By the 15th anniversary of ESPN, Mees (along with Chris Berman and Bob Ley) was one of three original SportsCenter anchors still with the network.

Death
On August 14, 1996, Mees, who did not know how to swim, drowned in a neighbor's swimming pool in Southington, Connecticut. Police initially said that Mees had jumped into the pool to save his younger daughter but later said they did not know how he ended up in the water and classified his death as an accident.

He and Michelle, his wife of almost 10 years, had two daughters: Lauren who was 8 years old and Gabrielle who was 4 at the time of his death.

References

External links
 1984 USFL - ESPN: Tom Mees interviews Commissioner Chet Simmons via YouTube
 

National Football League announcers
1949 births
1996 deaths
Accidental deaths in Connecticut
American television sports anchors
American television sports announcers
Arena football announcers
College basketball announcers in the United States
College football announcers
Deaths by drowning in the United States
Delaware Fightin' Blue Hens basketball
Major League Baseball broadcasters
National Hockey League broadcasters
People from Southington, Connecticut
People from Wilmington, Delaware
Tampa Bay Buccaneers announcers
United States Football League announcers
University of Delaware alumni
National Basketball Association broadcasters
College hockey announcers in the United States
People from Springfield Township, Delaware County, Pennsylvania
Burials in New Jersey